Muhammad ibn Isma'il al-Bukhari (‎, 21 July 810 – 1 September 870), commonly referred to as Imām al-Bukhāri or Imām Bukhāri, was a 9th-century Muslim muhaddith who is widely regarded as the most important hadith scholar in the history of Sunni Islam. Al-Bukhari's extant works include the hadith collection Sahih al-Bukhari, Al-Tarikh al-Kabir, and Al-Adab al-Mufrad. 

Born in Bukhara in present-day Uzbekistan, Al-Bukhari began learning hadith at a young age. He travelled across the Abbasid Caliphate and learned under several influential contemporary scholars. Bukhari memorized thousands of hadith narrations, compiling the Sahih al-Bukhari in 846. He spent the rest of his life teaching the hadith he had collected. Towards the end of his life, Bukhari faced claims the Quran was created, and was exiled from Nishapur. Subsequently, he moved to Khartank, near Samarkand.

Sahih al-Bukhari is revered as the most important hadith collection in Sunni Islam. Sahih al-Bukhari and Sahih Muslim, the hadith collection of Al-Bukhari's student Muslim ibn al-Hajjaj, are together known as the Sahihayn and are regarded by Sunnis as the most authentic books after the Quran. It is part of the Kutub al-Sittah, the six most highly regarded collections of hadith in Sunni Islam.

Life

Ancestry and early life 
Muhammad ibn Ismail al-Bukhari al-Ju'fi was born after the Friday prayer on Friday, 21 July 810 (13 Shawwal 194 AH) in the city of Bukhara in Greater Khorasan in present-day Uzbekistan. His father was Ismail ibn Ibrahim, a scholar of hadith and a student of Malik ibn Anas, Abd Allah ibn al-Mubarak, and Hammad ibn Salamah. Ismail died while Al-Bukhari was an infant. Al-Bukhari's great-grandfather, Al-Mughirah, settled in Bukhara after accepting Islam at the hands of Bukhara's governor, Yaman al-Ju'fi. As was the custom, he became a mawla of Yaman, and his family continued to carry the nisba "al-Ju'fi." 

Al-Mughirah's father, Bardizbah, is the earliest known ancestor of Al-Bukhari according to most scholars and historians. Bardizbah was a Zoroastrian Magi. Al-Subkī is the only scholar to name Bardizbah's father, who he says was named Bazzabah. Little is known of both of them except that they were Persian and followed the religion of their people. Historians have also not come across any information on Al-Bukhari's grandfather, Ibrahim ibn al-Mughirah.

Travels and education 
According to contemporary hadith scholar and historian Al-Dhahabi, al-Bukhari began studying hadith in the Hijri year 821 CE. He memorized the works of Abd Allah ibn al-Mubarak while still a child and began writing and narrating hadith while still an adolescent. In the Hijri year 826 CE, at the age of sixteen, Al-Bukhari performed the Hajj with his elder brother and widowed mother.  Al-Bukhari stayed in Mecca for two years, before moving to Medina where he wrote Qadhāyas-Sahābah wa at-Tābi'īn, a book about the companions of Muhammad and the tabi'un. He also wrote Al-Tārīkh al-Kabīr during his time in Medina. 

Al-Bukhari is known to have travelled to most of the important Islamic learning centres of his time, including Syria, Kufa, Basra, Egypt, Yemen, and Baghdad. He studied under prominent Islamic scholars including Ahmad ibn Hanbal, Ali ibn al-Madini, Yahya ibn Ma'in and Ishaq ibn Rahwayh. Al-Bukhari is known to have memorized over 600,000 hadith narrations.

Mihna, later years and death 

According to Jonathan Brown, following Ibn Hanbal, Al-Bukhari had reportedly declared that 'reciting the Quran is an element of createdness’. Through this assertion, Al-Bukhari had sought an alternative response to the doctrines of Mu'tazilites and declared that the element of creation is applied only to humans, not the Word of God. His statements were received negatively by prominent hadith scholars and he was driven out of Nishapur. Al-Bukhari, however, had only referred to the human action of reading the Qur’an, when he reportedly stated "My recitation of the Quran is created". Al-Dhahabi and Al-Subki asserted that Al-Bukhari was expelled due to the jealousy of certain scholars of Nishapur. Al-Bukhari spent the last twenty-four years of his life teaching the hadith he had collected. During the mihna, he fled to Khartank, a village near Samarkand, where he died on Friday, 1 September 870. Today his tomb lies within the Imam Bukhari Mausoleum in Hartang, Uzbekistan, 25 kilometers from Samarkand. It was restored in 1998 after centuries of neglect and dilapidation. The mausoleum complex consists of Al-Bukhari's tomb, a mosque, a madrasa, library, and a small collection of Qurans. The modern ground-level mausoleum tombstone of Al-Bukhari is only a cenotaph, the actual grave lies within a small crypt below the structure.

Works 

Sahih al-Bukhari is considered Al-Bukhari's magnum opus. It is a collection of approximately 7,563 hadith narrations across 97 chapters creating a basis for a complete system of jurisprudence without the use of speculative law. The book is highly regarded among Sunni Muslims, and most Sunni scholars consider it second only to the Quran in terms of authenticity. It is considered one of the most authentic collection of hadith, even ahead of Muwatta Imam Malik and Sahih Muslim. Alongside the latter, Sahih al-Bukhari is known as one of the 'Sahihayn (Two Sahihs)' and they are together part of the Kutub al-Sittah.One of the most famous stories from the Sahih al-Bukhari is the story of Muhammad's first revelation.

Al-Bukhari wrote three works discussing narrators of hadith with respect to their ability in conveying their material. These are Al-Tārīkh al-Kabīr, Al-Tarīkh al-Awsaţ, and Al-Tarīkh al-Ṣaghīr. Of these, Al-Tārīkh al-Kabīr is published and well-known, while Al-Tarīkh al-Ṣaghīr is lost. Al-Dhahabi quotes Al-Bukhari as having said, “When I turned eighteen years old, I began writing about the companions and the tabi'un and their statements. [...] At that time I also authored a book of history at the grave of the Prophet at night during a full moon." The books being referred to here were Qadhāyas-Sahābah wa at-Tābi'īn and Al-Tārīkh al-Kabīr. Al-Bukhari also wrote al-Kunā on patronymics, and Al-Ḍu'afā al-Ṣaghīr on weak narrators of hadith. Al-Adab al-Mufrad is a collection of hadith narrations on ethics and manners. 

In response to the accusations levied against him during his mihna, Al-Bukhari compiled the treatise Khalq Af'āl al-'Ibād, the earliest traditionalist representation of the position taken by Ahmad ibn Hanbal, in which Al-Bukhari explains that the Quran is God's uncreated speech, while maintaining that God creates human actions, as the Sunnis had insisted in their attacks on the free-will position of Qadariyah. The first section of the book reports narrations from earlier scholars such as Sufyan al-Thawri that affirmed the Sunni doctrine of the uncreated nature of the Quran and condemned anyone who held the contrary position as a Jahmi or Kāfir. The second section asserts that the acts of men are created, relying on Qur'anic verses and reports from earlier traditionalist scholars like Yahya ibn Sa'id al-Qatlan. In the last part of his treatise, Al-Bukhari harshly condemned the Mutazilites, defending the  belief that sound of the Qur'an being recited is created. Al-Bukhari cited Ahmad Ibn Hanbal as evidence for his position, re-affirming the latter's legacy and the former's allegiance to the Ahl al-Hadith.

Speculation

School of jurisprudence (shafi) 
Scholars like Jonathan Brown assert that Al-Bukhari was of the Ahl al-Hadith, an adherent of Ahmad Ibn Hanbal’s traditionalist school,  but fell victim to its most radical wing due to misunderstandings. This claim is supported by Hanbalis, although members of the Shafi'i and Ẓāhirī schools levy this claim as well. Scott Lucas argues that Al-Bukhari's legal positions were similar to those of the Ẓāhirīs and Hanbalis of his time, suggesting Al-Bukhari rejected qiyas and other forms of ra'y completely.  Many are of the opinion that Al-Bukhari was a mujtahid with his own madhhab. Munir Ahmad asserts that historically most jurists considered him to be a muhaddith (scholar of hadith) and not a faqīh (jurist), and that as a muhaddith, he followed the Shafi'i school.

According to some scholars, such as Christopher Melchert, and also Ash'ari theologians, including Ibn Hajar al-Asqalani and Al-Bayhaqi, Al-Bukhari was a follower of the Kullabi school of Sunni theology due to his position on the utterance of the Quran being created. Open Kullabis, such as the rationalist Harith al-Muhasibi, were harassed and made to relocate, a similar situation Bukhari found himself towards the latter years of his life. He was also known to be a student of Husayn Al-Karabisi (d. 245/859), who was a direct student of Imam Shafi'i from his period in Iraq. Al-Karabisi was also known to have associated himself with Ibn Kullab and the Kullabi school of thought.

Views on predestination 
Al-Bukhari also rebuked those who rejected of qadar (predestination) in Sahih al-Bukhari by quoting a verse of the Quran implying that God had precisely determined all human acts. According to Ibn Hajar al-Asqalani, Al-Bukhari signified that if someone was to accept autonomy in creating his acts, he would be assumed to be playing God's role and so would subsequently be declared a Mushrik. In another chapter, Al-Bukhari refutes the creeds of the Kharijites. According to Al-Ayni, the heading of that chapter was designed not only to refute the Kharijites but any who held similar beliefs.

See also 

 Sahih al-Bukhari
 Al-Tarikh al-Kabir
 Al-Adab al-Mufrad

Notes and references

Notes

Citations

Sources 

 Bukhari, Imam (194-256H) اللإمام البُخاري; An educational Encyclopedia of Islam; Syed Iqbal Zaheer

 Abdul Qadir Muhammad Jalal et al., "Elevating Imam Al Bukhari: Affirming the Status of Imam Al Bukhari and His Sahih by Dispelling the Misconceptions Surrounding them", Lagos 2021

External links

Studies 

 Ghassan Abdul-Jabbar, Bukhari, London, 2007
 Jonathan Brown, The canonization of al-Bukhari and Muslim, Leiden 2007
 Eerik Dickinson, The development of early Sunnite hadith criticism, Leiden 2001

 Scott C. Lucas, "The legal principles of Muḥammad b. Ismāʿīl al-Bukhārī and their relationship to classical Salafi Islam," ILS 13 (2006), 289–324
 Christopher Melchert, "Bukhārī and early hadith criticism," JAOS 121 (2001), 7–19
 Christopher Melchert, "Bukhārī and his Ṣaḥīḥ," Le Muséon 123 (2010), 425–54
 Alphonse Mingana, An important manuscript of the traditions of Bukhārī, Cambridge 1936

Hadith compilers
Hadith scholars
Transoxanian Islamic scholars
Shafi'is
People from Bukhara
Persian Sunni Muslim scholars of Islam
Biographical evaluation scholars
810 births
870 deaths